Ay Te Dejo en San Antonio y Más! is the title of a compilation album released by American performer Flaco Jiménez. It was released in 1990 by Arhoolie Records and contains all of the songs from Jiménez's 1986 album Ay Te Dejo en San Antonio (Arhoolie, 3021) and most of the songs from his 1980 album El Sonido de San Antonio (Arhoolie, 3014).

For the original Ay Te Dejo en San Antonio album, Jiménez was awarded the Best Mexican-American/Tejano Music Performance at the 29th Annual Grammy Awards.

Track listing
Ay Te Dejo en San Antonio – 2:51
Juárez	– 4:15
Mentiste Cuando Dijiste – 3:23
El Barrelito – 2:42
Las Gaviotas – 3:17
Morir Soñando – 2:20
Rosa María – 2:29
Traigo un Recuerdo – 3:21
Amor de los Dos – 2:26
La Barranca – 2:26
Mujer Casada –	2:46
La Paloma – 2:37
El Cerrito – 2:09
Ni el Dinero Ni Nada – 4:14
Ángel Mío – 2:38
Grítenme Piedras del Campo – 3:39
Un Viejo Amor – 2:20
Tu Nuevo Cariñito – 2:43
El Gallito – 2:28
La Piedrera – 2:20
Spanish Eyes – 3:33
Vuelve a Quererme – 3:10

Personnel
 Flaco Jiménez – accordion, vocals
 Eduardo Garcia – bajo sexto (tracks 1–10, 17, 18, 21, 22); vocals (track 7)
 Toby Torres – bajo sexto and vocals (tracks 1–10, 17, 18, 21, 22)
 Hugo Gonzales – bajo sexto and vocals (tracks 1–16)
 Joey Lopez – bajo sexto (tracks 11–16)
 Oscar Tellez – bajo sexto (tracks 19–22)
 Henry "Big Red" Ojeda – bass (tracks 1–10, 17, 18, 21, 22)
 Ruben Valle – bass (tracks 11–16)
 Francisco Salazar – bass (tracks 19, 20)
 Isaac Garcia – drums (tracks 1–8, 21, 22)
 Juan "Eddie Hurricane" Bosquez – drums (tracks 19–22)
 Fred Ojeda – vocals (tracks 11–16)

Chart performance
For the original 1986 release:

References

External links
 
 

1990 compilation albums
1980 albums
1986 albums
Flaco Jiménez albums
Spanish-language albums
Grammy Award for Best Mexican/Mexican-American Album